The 2022 CS Denis Ten Memorial Challenge was held on October 26–29, 2022 in Almaty, Kazakhstan. It was part of the 2022–23 ISU Challenger Series. Medals were awarded in the disciplines of men's singles, women's singles, and ice dance.

Entries 
The International Skating Union published the list of entries on October 3, 2022.

Changes to preliminary assignments

Results

Men

Women

Ice dance

References 

2022 in figure skating
Sports competitions in Almaty
CS
CS